Kovak may refer to:

 Kovak (band), a British band based in Brighton
 Father Kovak, a fictional character in the film End of Days
 Joe Kovak, a fictional character in the film Jet Job
 Johnny Kovak, a fictional character in the film F.I.S.T.
 Jimmy Kovak, a fictional character in the film Big Ideas
 Michael Kovak, a fictional character in the film The Rite
 Private Kovak, a fictional character in the film To Hell and Back
 Sandra Kovak, a fictional character in the film The Great Lie
 Spence Kovak, a fictional character that has appeared in several television series

See also
 Kovač (disambiguation)
 Kováč, a surname
 Kovack, a surname